The Timuri, or Taimuri, are a sub-tribe of the Aimaq people of Afghanistan and Iran, one of the four major Aimaq tribes, which also include the Firozkohi, Taymani, and Jamshidi. The Timuri originated in western Badghis Province. They mostly speak the Aimaq dialect of Persian, but some members of the tribe in Baghlan Province have adopted Pashto.

The Timuri were once the largest and most powerful of the Aimaqs. They are descendants of Timur and the Mughal Empire. Nowadays, they live in Afghanistan and Iran. In Iran, they live in the former Khorasan Province and around Mashhad. In Afghanistan, their traditional nomadic homeland is Badghis Province, while others are settled in oases near Herat and Shindand in western Afghanistan and near Ghazni in central Afghanistan. There is also a small group of Pashtunised pastoralist Timuri in Baghlan Province in northeastern Afghanistan.

Johnathan Lee notes that in 19th century accords, the Taimuri were often confused with the Taimani, but as the Taimuri were generally a small tribe living in Persian territory, it is usually the Taimani that chroniclers intended to note.

See also 
 Aimaq people
 Hazaras
 Timurid dynasty

References 

Aymaq
Ethnic groups in Badghis Province
Ethnic groups in Afghanistan
Ethnic groups in Iran
Modern nomads
Timurid dynasty